Christiane Nielsen (10 September 1936 – 8 April 2007) was a German film actress. She appeared in 24 films between 1957 and 1967. She was born in Würzburg, Germany and died in Frankfurt, Germany.

Selected filmography
  (1959)
 The Moralist (1959)
 Mrs. Warren's Profession (1960)
 Until Money Departs You (1960)
 The Woman by the Dark Window (1960)
 Bankraub in der Rue Latour (1961)
 The Puzzle of the Red Orchid (1962)
 My Daughter and I (1963)
 Love Nights in the Taiga (1967)
  (1968, TV miniseries)

References

External links

1936 births
2007 deaths
Actors from Würzburg
German film actresses
20th-century German actresses